Miriam Gebhardt (born 28 January 1962) is a German historian and writer.

Life 
Gebhardt was born in Freiburg, Germany and trained as a journalist. From 1982, she worked as an editor.
From 1988 to 1993 she studied social and economic history, regional history and modern German literature at Munich University. In 1988 she obtained a doctorate in Modern History under Clemens Wischermann at the University of Münster with a thesis on family memories.

From 2003 Gebhardt held an academic post at Collaborative Research Centre 485 (Norm and Symbol) at the University of Konstanz, where she obtained her habilitation in Modern and Contemporary History in July 2008. She currently lectures at the University of Konstanz as an adjunct professor and writes non-fiction books.

Gebhardt also works as a journalist and publicist and has written for Die Zeit.

In a book published in 2015,  (When the Soldiers Came), she drew attention to rapes committed by allied soldiers, including the western allies, in the aftermath of World War II. It drew media attention in Germany and abroad.

Publications

As editor
 With Katja Patzel-Mattern and Stefan Zahlmann: 
Das integrative Potential von Elitenkulturen: Festschrift für Clemens Wischermann[The Integrative Potential of Elite Cultures: Festschrift for Clemens Wischermann]. Steiner, Stuttgart 2013, .

Notes and references

External links
 
 Personal Web site
 Miriam Gebhardt on the Web site of the University of Konstanz
 

1962 births
Living people
Writers from Freiburg im Breisgau
German non-fiction writers
20th-century German historians
21st-century German historians
Contemporary historians
German newspaper journalists
German women journalists
Academic staff of the University of Konstanz
20th-century German women writers
German women historians
20th-century German writers
21st-century German writers
21st-century German women writers